Velvet Tinmine is a compilation album consisting of 20 obscure, yet high quality, British pop rock tracks from the glam rock era (period roughly between 1973 and 1975).  Composed of forgotten album tracks and almost hit singles, most of these songs have not been released outside of the UK prior to this 2003 compilation.

Track listing
"Rebels Rule" - Iron Virgin  
"Another School Day" - Hello  
"Let’s Get The Party Going" - Warwick  
"Morning Bird" - The Damned (NOT the later punk band of the same name) 
"Kick Your Boots Off" - Sisters  
"Big Wheels Turning" - Flame  
"Toughen Up" - Arrows  
"Let's Do It Again" - Crunch  
"Rock Star" - Bearded Lady  
"(Baby) I Gotta Go" - Simon Turner  
"Va Va Va Voom" - Brett Smiley  
"Love Machine" - Shakane  
"The Comets Are Coming" - Washington Flyers  
"Slippery Rock 70s" - Stavely Makepeace  
"Neo City" - Plod  
"I Wanna Go To A Disco" - Ricky Wilde  
"Bay City Rollers We Love You" - Tartan Horde  
"Shake A Tail" - Big Wheel  
"Wild Thing" - Fancy  
"Kick Out the Jams" - Tubthumper

References

External links
[ Review: Allmusic]
Review: EW.com

RPM Records (United Kingdom) albums
2003 compilation albums